Nepřevázka is a municipality and village in Mladá Boleslav District in the Central Bohemian Region of the Czech Republic. It has about 400 inhabitants.

History
The first written mention of Nepřevázka is from 1225.

References

External links

Villages in Mladá Boleslav District